Belleville is a city in Ontario, Canada situated on the eastern end of Lake Ontario, located at the mouth of the Moira River and on the Bay of Quinte. Belleville is between Ottawa and Toronto, along the Quebec City-Windsor Corridor. Its population as of the 2016 census was 50,716 (census agglomeration population 103,472). It is the seat of Hastings County, but politically independent of it, and is the centre of the Bay of Quinte Region.

History

The historic Anishinaabe (Mississaugas) village, known as Asukhknosk in the 18th century, was part of land purchased by the Crown to use for the resettlement of United Empire Loyalists who were forced to leave the Thirteen Colonies in North America, after the United States achieved independence.

The settlement was first called Singleton's Creek after an early settler, George Singleton. Next it was called Meyer's Creek, after prominent settler and industrialist John Walden Meyers (1745–1821), one of the founders of Belleville. He built a sawmill and grist mill. After an 1816 visit to the settlement by colonial administrator Sir Francis Gore and his wife, Lady Annabella Gore, it was renamed as Belleville in her honour.

Henry Corby, who arrived in 1832 with his new wife Alma Williams (they had married before immigrating), settled in Belleville. He was a merchant, setting up a grocery store and other businesses. He founded the H. Corby Distillery, and promoted the municipality. He also represented it in Parliament.

Their son Henry Corby Jr. (Harry) took over the family business and continued to support the town: he donated funding to create the public library, helped develop the park at Massassaga Point, established the Corby Charitable Fund, helped raise funds to build the first bridge across the Bay of Quinte and donated the land and development of Corby Park.

In 1836 Belleville became an incorporated village. By 1846, it had a population of 2040. Several stone buildings were soon constructed, including a jail and court house, as well as some of the seven churches. Transportation to other communities was by stagecoach and, in summer, by steamboat along the lake. Two weekly newspapers were published. The post office received mail daily. Several court and government offices were located here. In addition to tradesmen, there was some small industry, three cloth factories, a paper mill, two grist mills, three tanneries and two breweries. The seventeen taverns outnumbered the churches and most businesses. The oldest surviving residence within the original boundaries, 67 South Front Street, was built by Alexander Oliphant Petrie in 1814.

With the completion of the Grand Trunk Railway in 1856, Belleville became an important railway junction. Added to a booming trade in lumber and successful farming in the area, the railway helped increase the commercial and industrial growth. Belleville was incorporated as a town in 1850.

In 1858 the iron bridge was completed over the Moira River at Bridge Street; it was the first iron bridge in Hastings County. By 1865, the population reached 6,000. Telephone service to 29 subscribers was in place by 1883; electricity became available in 1885 and in 1886, the town began to offer municipal water service. In 1870, Ontario's first school for the deaf was established in Belleville. Under Dr. Charles B. Coughlin, the school was recognized as making a significant contribution to special education. Originally called the Ontario Institution for the Education of the Deaf and Dumb, the facility was renamed as Ontario School for the Deaf. In 1974, it was renamed as the Sir James Whitney School.

Belleville's town hall operates in a building first constructed in 1873 to house the public market and administrative offices. It was designed in the High Victorian Gothic style and retains much of its original appearance. In 1877, Belleville was legally incorporated as a city.

In 1998, the city was amalgamated with the surrounding Township of Thurlow to form an expanded City of Belleville as part of Ontario-wide municipal restructuring. The city also annexed portions of Quinte West to the west.

Late-20th-century franchises founded here include the Dixie Lee Fried Chicken chain in 1964 and, in 1978, Journey's End Corporation's economy, limited-service hotel chain.

Geography
Belleville is located at the mouth of the Moira River on the Bay of Quinte in southeastern Ontario between the cities of Quinte West to the west and Napanee to the east. These cities are connected by both Ontario's Highway 2 and the Macdonald-Cartier Freeway (Highway 401); The city is also served by Highway 37, running north–south from Belleville towards Tweed to the east of the Moira River; and Highway 62 (once Highway 14 south of 401), northwards towards Madoc, and southward to Prince Edward County over the Bay Bridge.

Belleville is located in a transitional zone which may be considered part of either the Central Ontario or Eastern Ontario regions by different sources. Officially, Belleville is properly considered part of the Central Ontario region as it is located west of the St. Lawrence River's starting point, but the city is popularly considered part of Eastern Ontario as it shares the eastern region's area code 613 and K postal code.

Neighbourhoods
In addition to the Belleville city centre, the city of Belleville also comprises a number of villages and hamlets, including the following communities: Bayshore, Cannifton, Corbyville, Foxboro, Frink Centre, Gilead, Halloway, Honeywell Corners, Latta, Loyalist, Philipston, Plainfield, Pointe Anne, Roslin (partially), Thrasher's Corners, Thurlow, Thurlow South and Zion Hill.

Climate
Belleville's climate has four distinct seasons. The city's traditional humid continental climate (Dfb)(hot summers, cold winters) is moderated by its location near Lake Ontario. The lake moderates temperature extremes, cooling hot summer days and warming cold days during the fall and winter. Because of this, winter snowfall is somewhat limited due to the increased frequency of precipitation falling as rain during the winter months. In the summer months, severe thunderstorm activity is usually limited because of the non-favourable lake breeze conditions. The city, being located on the north shore of Lake Ontario, is also in an unfavourable location for lake effect snow. One notable exception, however, was in December 2010 when 14 cm of snow occurred in one day as a result of a snow band from Lake Ontario. The summer months do not typically experience exceedingly hot temperatures, however, humidity levels can make daytime highs uncomfortable. Summer rainfall is usually modest and delivered by passing thunderstorms or warm fronts. Remnants of tropical systems do pass through on occasion towards summer's end, resulting in one or two days of consistently wet weather. The winter season is highly variable, with the record setting winter of 2007–08 experiencing near 270 cm of snow. Four years later, the winter of 2011–12 experienced only 60 cm of snow. Winter temperatures are also highly variable, even in one season. Air masses change frequently, and while a few days may see above freezing temperatures at a time in January, the next week may bring cold and snowfall. Autumn is usually mild, with an increase in precipitation starting in late September as conditions for fall storms develop.

Demographics

Belleville's population is mostly of European descent. The racial make up of Belleville is as of 2021 is 85.1% White, 5.6% Indigenous and 9.3% visible minorities. The largest visible minority groups in Belleville are South Asian (3.9%), Black (1.3%), Filipino (0.9%) and Chinese (0.8%) . 

89.7% of residents speak English as their mother tongue. Other common first languages are French (1.5%), Gujarati (0.7%), Punjabi (0.6%), Spanish (0.5%), and Chinese (0.5%). 1.1% list both English and a non-official language as mother tongues, while 0.4% list both English and French.

As of 2021, 53.4% of residents are Christian, down from 67.1% in 2011. 22.7% are Protestant, 19.8% are Catholic, 6.0% are Christian n.o.s. 4.9% are members of other Christian denominations or Christian-related traditions. 42.1% are non-religious or secular, up from 30.3% in 2011. The remaining 4.5% affiliate with another religion, up from 2.6% in 2011. The largest non-Christian religions are Hinduism (1.4%), Sikhism (1.0%) and Islam (0.8%).

Economy

Procter & Gamble, Kellogg's, Bardon Supplies Limited, Redpath, W.T. Hawkins Ltd, Sigma Stretch Film Canada, Hexo Cannabis, Autosystems Manufacturing (Magna International), Amer Sports Canada, and Avaya (formerly Nortel) are corporations operating in Belleville. Many other manufacturing sector companies operate within the City of Belleville, including Bioniche Life Sciences, Sprague Foods, Airborne Systems Canada Ltd, Berry Plastics Canada, CPK Interior Products, Hanon (formerly Halla) Climate Control Canada, Reid's Dairy, Parmalat Canada – Black Diamond Cheese Division and Norampac Inc.

Belleville is home to two shopping malls: The Bay View Mall in east-end Belleville and the Quinte Mall along Bell Boulevard (south of Highway 401) in North Belleville. In January 2017 a Shorelines Casino opened on Bell Boulevard.

Arts and culture

Theatre
 Pinnacle Playhouse
 The Empire Theatre
 Moonpath Productions
 Quinte Ballet School of Canada

Annual events
January
 Civic Levee

February
 Downtown Docfest

March

 Quinte Sportsman Boat & RV Show

May

 Quinte Trash Bash
 5k Fun Run
 Front Street Farmers Market

June
 Berrylicious
 Rockfest
 Quinte Ballet School of Canada Spring Showcase
July
 Belleville's Canada D'Eh
 Waterfront and Ethnic Festival
Belleville Poutine Feast
Quinte Ballet School of Canada Summer Dance Intensive
Belleville Jazz Festival

August
 Quinte Ribfest
Dragon Boat Festival

September
 Quinte Fall Fair and Exhibition
 Porchfest Belleville

November
 Belleville Festival of Trees
 Belleville Nighttime Santa Claus Parade
 Christmas at the Pier

December
 Quinte Ballet School of Canada performs Holiday Dance - experts from "The Nutcracker"
 Christmas at the Pier

Sports
The Belleville Senators play in the American Hockey League (AHL) and began play in the 2017–18 season as the top minor league affiliate of the National Hockey League's Ottawa Senators. They play at the CAA Arena, formally Yardmen Arena, located on 265 Cannifton Road.

Belleville Bulls played in the Ontario Hockey League from 1981 to 2015. The team was then sold and relocated to Hamilton, Ontario. Belleville was also previously home to two senior hockey teams, the Belleville Macs and the Belleville McFarlands. Belleville is also home the Bay of Quinte Yacht Club, which challenged for the America's Cup in 1881. Belleville also sports minor hockey league teams such as the Belleville Bearcats (female) and the Belleville Jr. Bulls (male).

The Belleville McFarlands were a men's senior ice hockey team in the Ontario Hockey Association Senior division from 1956 to 1961. The McFarlands were Allan Cup champions in 1958, defeating the Kelowna Packers four games to three, and the World Championship in 1959. The team name was revived by a later team in the Eastern Ontario Senior Hockey League from 2003 to 2006, known as the Belleville Macs

Shannonville Motorsport Park has hosted rounds of the Canadian Touring Car Championship, the Canadian Superbike Championship and the CASC Ontario Region championships.

Government

Local government is represented by Belleville City Council with a mayor and eight councillors. There are two city wards with Ward 1 (Belleville) represented by six councillors and Ward 2 (Thurlow) by two councillors. Ward 1 consists of the historic city and Ward 2 was created in 1998 with the amalgamation of Township of Thurlow. City Council sits at Belleville City Hall.

Police Service
The city has had its own police force since 1834, and constables since 1790. The force has about 100 sworn members headed by a Chief of Police and a Deputy Chief. The service is stationed out of one location only. Policing on provincial highways (37, 62 and 401) are provided by the Ontario Provincial Police from the Centre Hastings detachment.

Infrastructure

Transportation
Belleville is serviced by the 401 highway system, and bus service to and from Toronto Pearson International Airport is provided by Megabus. Deseronto Transit provides public transportation services to destinations including Deseronto, Napanee, and Prince Edward County.

Belleville is located on the Toronto-Montreal main rail lines for both Canadian National Railway and Canadian Pacific Railway; both companies provide freight access. VIA Rail also operates five daily passenger services each way along its Quebec City–Windsor Corridor.

Major routes
 Highway 62
 Highway 37/Cannifton Road Parkway
 Highway 2/Dundas Street.
 Bell Boulevard/Adam Street
 College Street/Airport Parkway

Hospital 
Belleville General Hospital is located near Highway 2 and is Belleville's main healthcare facility. The hospital is one of the four hospitals in the region under Quinte Health Care. The corporate headquarters of Quinte Health Care is located in the Belleville location.

Education

Post-secondary
The Academy of Learning College is a local college located on the east end of Belleville.

Loyalist College is a local public community college located on the border of Belleville and Quinte West on Wallbridge Loyalist Road.

Public schools
The public school system is served by the Hastings & Prince Edward District School Board. The Catholic School system is served by the Algonquin and Lakeshore Catholic District School Board.

Secondary schools:
Centennial Secondary School
 Eastside Secondary School
Bayside Secondary School (Quinte West)

Elementary schools:
 Susanna Moodie Elementary School 
 Parkdale Public Elementary School 
 Queen Elizabeth Elementary School 
 Prince of Wales Elementary School 
 Harry J. Clarke Elementary School (Offers French immersion) 
 Queen Victoria Elementary School
 Sir John A Macdonald School
 Prince Charles Elementary School
 Foxboro Public School
 Bayside Elementary School] (Offers French immersion}
 Harmony Public School

Separate schools
The following are Belleville area schools managed by the Algonquin and Lakeshore Catholic District School Board.

Secondary schools:
 Nicholson Catholic College
 St. Theresa Catholic Secondary School

Elementary schools:
 Our Lady of Fatima Catholic School
 St Michael's Catholic School (French immersion)
 St Joseph's Catholic School
 Georges Vanier Catholic School
 Holy Rosary Catholic School
 Saint Maracle Catholic School

Provincial demonstration schools
 Sir James Whitney School for the Deaf
 Sagonaska School

Private schools
 Academy of Learning College
 Quinte Ballet School of Canada
 Quinte Christian High School
 Belleville Christian School
 Belleville Montessori School
 Albert College

Media

Print
 Belleville Intelligencer (Tuesday thru Saturday)
Community Press (Every Thursday)

Radio

Television

Internet
 Quinte News
QNet News
InQuinte.ca

Sister cities
The City of Belleville has three sister city arrangements with communities outside of Canada which include:
 Lahr, Baden-Württemberg, Germany – established in 1971
 Gunpo, Gyeonggi-do, South Korea – established in 1996
 Zhucheng, Shandong, People's Republic of China – established in 1996

Notable people

Lee Aaron, hard rock and jazz singer. Best known for "Metal Queen"
Marianne Ackerman, playwright, novelist, and journalist'
Lauren Ash, actress best known for "Superstore"
Drew Bannister, professional ice hockey defenceman
Dennis Bock, novelist and short story writer
Michael Botterill, professional Canadian football linebacker
Sir MacKenzie Bowell, Canada's fifth Prime Minister
Wilfred Leigh Brintnell, a pioneering Canadian aviator
James Brown, politician
Stevie Cameron, award-winning investigative journalist and best-selling author
James Collip, co-discoverer of insulin
Matt Cooke, NHL hockey player
Nick Cousins, NHL player
Brander Craighead, football player
Bob Crawford, retired NHL hockey player
Lou Crawford, former OHL and AHL head coach
Marc Crawford, NHL head coach
Jack Devine, CJBQ sports commentator, and president of the Canadian Amateur Hockey Association
Bob Dillabough, retired NHL player with the Detroit Red Wings, Boston Bruins and the Oakland Seals
Herbert Henry Dow, Dow Chemical, Born February 26, 1866
Rick Green, retired NHLer
Ellie Anne Harvie, actress
Bobby Hull, Hockey Hall of Fame member
Brett Hull, son of Bobby, Hockey Hall of Fame member (inducted 2009)
Dennis Hull, Bobby's younger brother, member of 1972 Team Canada
Aislinn Hunter, poet and fiction writer
Frances Itani, fiction writer, poet and essayist
Avril Lavigne, Canadian singer/songwriter and actress, born in Belleville and lived here until age five.
James Frederick Lister, lawyer
Norm Maracle, hockey goaltender
James Marker, inventor of Cheezies
Rick Meagher, retired NHL player
Rick Mofina, author of crime fiction and thriller novels
Susanna Moodie (1803–1885), author, moved to Belleville with her husband in 1840 after several years spent "roughing it in the bush" near Lakefield, Ontario
Riyo Mori, Miss Universe 2007, spent her teenage years in Belleville, studying at Centennial Secondary School and at Quinte Ballet School of Canada
Farley Mowat, author, born in Belleville
William Barton Northrup, lawyer and politician
Brian Orser, figure skater and coach
Shawn O'Sullivan, 1984 Olympic silver medalist boxer
Pete Quaife, bassist for The Kinks in the 1960s, lived in Quinte Region from 1980 to 2005
Peter Quinney, Canadian football player, Toronto Argonauts
Andrew Raycroft, NHL goaltender
Brad Richardson, NHL forward
Wallace Havelock Robb, poet and naturalist
Alexander Milton Ross, abolitionist and agent for the Underground Railroad
Johnny Rutherford, former Major League Baseball pitcher
Nancy Anne Sakovich, actress and former model
Mike Schad, National Football League offensive lineman
Martin Seemungal, Foreign Correspondent CBC, ABC, CTV, PBS Newshour
Andrew Shaw, retired NHL player
Derek Smith, NHL forward
Harry Leslie Smith, British writer, political commentator and Royal Air Force veteran
Matt Stajan, NHL forward resided in Belleville from 2000 to 2004
Manly E. MacDonald, Semi-impressionistic painter
Alex Stieda, former professional road bicycle racer
Chris Valentine, former ice hockey player and coach
Thomas Campbell Wallbridge, lawyer and politician
John Weldon, animated movies director, Oscar Award winner (1979)
Ed Westfall, retired NHL player
The Wilkinsons, country music group
Ty Wishart, professional ice hockey player
Jerry Yanover, political advisor

See also
 Belleville Cemetery
 Belleville Transit
 Foxboro

Notes

References

External links

 

 
Cities in Ontario
Single-tier municipalities in Ontario
Populated places on Lake Ontario in Canada